The rough-legged tyrannulet (Phyllomyias burmeisteri) is a species of bird in the family Tyrannidae.  It is found in Argentina, Bolivia, Brazil, and Paraguay. Its natural habitats are subtropical or tropical moist lowland forest and subtropical or tropical moist montane forest. The white-fronted tyrannulet was formerly considered a subspecies.

References

rough-legged tyrannulet
Birds of the Yungas
Birds of the Atlantic Forest
rough-legged tyrannulet
Taxonomy articles created by Polbot